Documentary film festivals are film festivals devoted solely to documentary film, which is a broad category of visual expression that is based on the attempt, in one fashion or another, to "document" reality.

Although "documentary film" originally referred to movies shot on film stock, it has subsequently expanded to include video and digital productions that can be either direct-to-video or made for a television series. Documentary, as it applies here, works to identify a "filmmaking practice, a cinematic tradition, and mode of audience reception" that is continually evolving and is without clear boundaries.

In many cities around the world, documentary film festivals are held annually to showcase documentaries made that year. Many of them are theme or genre specific.

See also
List of film festivals

References

Documentary
 
Festivals